Xenia Benivolski is a curator of contemporary art, sound and music, an art critic and a writer. She founded several collectives and art galleries in Toronto, including The White House gallery, 8-11 gallery, The Feminist Art Museum, and SUGAR. Benivolski has given public lectures at The Power Plant Contemporary Art Gallery the Museum of Contemporary Art Toronto, and the Art Gallery of York University. She contributes to Art-Agenda, Artforum and the Wire

Curatorial Projects
In 2008, Benivolski co-founded The White House Studio Project along with Christy Kunitzky and Jon McCurley (of Life of a Craphead). The idea behind The White House was to rent a residential space and turn it into artist studios. It was described as a reaction to Toronto's conservative climate and clawbacks in arts funding. The space was considered one of the best places to see and make art in Toronto, a 2,600 sq. ft. community centre and active exhibition space with a wood shop, zine library and screen printing facilities. The White House was recognized as a valuable space for culture in Toronto by Making Space for Culture, a project led by the City of Toronto.

In 2014, Benivolski co-founded 8–11, an art collective and gallery in Toronto's Chinatown. The gallery's original sign, a spoof on 7-Eleven's logo, drew controversy and a cease and desist order after L.A-based DJ Skrillex posted a photo of the gallery on Instagram.

In 2016, Benivolski co-founded The Feminist Art Museum with Su-Ying Lee. The goal of the project was to bridge feminist art institutions in North America, and included exhibitions, talks, workshops, and performances. In 2017, The Feminist Art Museum completed a residency at the Santa Fe Art Institute. In 2017, Benivolski was one of four international curators at the 7th Beijing International Art Biennale. In 2020, Benivolski curated the first solo exhibition in Canada of work by Latvian-born, Montreal-based artist Zanis Waldheims (1909–93).

Benivolski co-founded SUGAR Contemporary in 2019, a contemporary art gallery near Sugar Beach in Toronto. SUGAR was voted best new art space in Toronto in 2019.

She is a curator and editor of the e-flux project You Can't Trust Music, a web-based art and music project that connects artist and musicians through thematic programs featuring Ryuichi Sakamoto, Shiro Takatani, Julieta Aranda, Ayesha Hameed, Felicia Atkinson, Elin Már Øyen Vister and others.

In 2011 Benivolski organized a donation drive to support the community of Attawapiskat in Northern Ontario after the community declared a state of emergency. Donations of winter clothing, medicine and heaters were driven by truck to Timmins then flown to the remote community.

References 

Date of birth missing (living people)
Canadian art curators
Living people
University of Toronto alumni
Canadian women curators
Year of birth missing (living people)